Chris McAlister (born 3 December 1995) is a British athlete specialising in the 400m hurdles. He represented Great Britain in the men's 400m hurdles event at the 2019 World Athletics Championships. as well as the 2019 European Team Championships in Bydgoszcz, Poland.

His personal best is 49.16 seconds, achieved in BAUHAUS-galan, Stockholm in 2021.

Outside of athletics, he works as a full-time civil servant.

References 

British male hurdlers
1995 births
Living people
World Athletics Championships athletes for Great Britain